Chesterfield Gorge may refer to a location in the United States:

Chesterfield Gorge (Massachusetts)
Chesterfield Gorge Natural Area in New Hampshire